Rainer Waser (born September 16, 1955, in Frankfurt) is a German professor of Electrical Engineering at RWTH Aachen University. He is also director of the section Electronic Materials at the Peter Grünberg Institute which is located on the campus of Jülich Research Center (Forschungszentrum Jülich). His research and teaching is on solid-state chemistry and defect chemistry to electronic properties and modelling, the technology of new materials and the physical properties of construction components.

Important findings include insights in the functioning of the so-called memristors.

Waser grew up in Heusenstamm near Frankfurt. He studied Physical Chemistry at Darmstadt University of Technology where he received a diploma degree in 1979. Then he went to the University of Southampton to conduct research at the Institute of Electrochemistry. After that he turned to Darmstadt and worked as scientific assistant until he completed his PhD.

Career 
Waser joined the Philips research laboratories (research group Electronic Ceramics) at Aachen. In 1992, Waser accepted a Chair for Electronic Materials in the Faculty of Electrical Science and Information Technology at RWTH Aachen University. In 2012, Waser was elected to the post of Speaker of the Department of Electrical Engineering and Information Technology at Aachen university. Waser was awarded the renowned Gottfried Wilhelm Leibniz Prize in 2014.

Awards and honors
A comprehensive list can be found in the cv on the institute's website.
 2015 – Honorary doctorate from the University of Silesia in Katowice
 2014 – Tsungming-Tu Prize, awarded by the National Science Council in Taiwan (the country’s highest academic distinction which can be bestowed on non-Taiwanese citizens)
 2014 – Gottfried Wilhelm Leibniz Prize
 2007 – Masao Ikeda Award, Ikeda Memorial Foundation, Kyoto, Japan
 2001 – Outstanding Achievements Award, International Symposium on Integrated Ferroelectrics (ISIF)
 2000 – Ferroelectrics Recognition Award, IEEE Ultrasonics, Ferroelectrics, and Frequency Control Society

Fellowships and Academy Membership 
 Fellow of the North-Rhine Westphalian Academy of Sciences, Humanities and the Arts.
 Spokesperson of the section Future information technology (FIT) within the Helmholtz-Zentrum Berlin

Other Functions 
 Executive Advisory Board Member of the journal Advanced Functional Materials

Selected works

External links 
 Website of the Electronic Materials Research Laboratory (Waser's Institute at RWTH Aachen)

References 

1955 births
German electrical engineers
German physical chemists
Academic staff of RWTH Aachen University
Gottfried Wilhelm Leibniz Prize winners
Living people
Technische Universität Darmstadt alumni
Engineers from Frankfurt
Solid state chemists